Lord Nairne is a title in the Peerage of Scotland, created by Charles II for Sir Robert Nairne of Strathord in 1681, which since 1995 is held by the Viscount Mersey.

History
Sir Robert Nairne of Strathord (c. 1620–1683), a supporter of Charles II, who was created Baron Nairne in 1681. After his death without issue the barony passed to his son-in-law, Lord William Murray (c. 1664–1726), the younger son of John Murray, 1st Marquess of Atholl, husband of his only daughter Margaret Nairne (1669–1747). Lord William Murray, who took the name of Nairne and became 2nd Baron Nairne, joined the standard of the Jacobites in 1715; he was taken prisoner at the battle of Preston and was sentenced to death. He was, however, pardoned, but his title was forfeited. On 24 June 1721 he was created Earl of Nairne, Viscount of Stanley and Lord of [ ] in the Jacobite Peerage by the Old Pretender. His son John (c. 1691–1770), who but for the forfeiture would have been the 3rd Baron Nairne, was also taken prisoner at Preston, but he was soon set at liberty. In the rising of 1745 he was one of the Jacobite leaders, being present at the battles of Prestonpans, of Falkirk and of Culloden, and consequently he was attainted in 1746; but escaped to France. His son John (died 1782) was the father of William Murray Nairne (1757–1830), who, being restored to the barony of Nairne in 1824, became the 5th baron. He married Carolina, the daughter of Laurence Oliphant (one of the foremost supporters of the Jacobite cause), and a well known Scottish songwriter. The male line became extinct when his son William, the 6th baron (1808–1837), died unmarried. The next heir was a cousin, Margaret, Baroness Keith of Stonehaven Marischal (1788–1867), wife of Auguste Charles Joseph, comte de Flahaut de la Billarderie, but she did not claim the title. In 1874, the right of her daughter, Emily the wife of the Henry, 4th Marquess of Lansdowne, was allowed by the House of Lords. The Marquess and Marchioness were both succeeded by their eldest son Henry Charles Keith Petty-Fitzmaurice, 5th Marquess of Lansdowne and 9th Lord Nairne. The lordship remained a subsidiary title of the marquessate until the death in 1944 of his grandson, Charles, 7th Marquess. Charles was succeeded in the marquessate by his cousin while the Scottish lordship passed to his sister Katherine Evelyn Constance Bigham, who became the 12th Lady Nairne. She was the wife of Edward Clive Bigham, 3rd Viscount Mersey. The Viscount and Viscountess were both succeeded by their eldest son, Richard, 4th Viscount and 13th Lord.  the titles are held by the latter's son, the 5th Viscount and 14th Lord Nairne.

The family seat is Bignor Park, near Pulborough, Sussex.

Lords Nairne (1681)
Robert Nairne, 1st Lord Nairne (c. 1620–1683)
William Murray, 2nd Lord Nairne (1664–1726) (attainted 1716)
John Nairne, de jure 3rd Lord Nairne (1691–1770)
John Nairne, de jure 4th Lord Nairne (died 1782)
William Murray Nairne, 5th Lord Nairne (1757–1830) (restored 1824)
William Murray Nairne, 6th Lord Nairne (1808–1837)
Margaret Mercer Elphinstone, 7th Lady Nairne, 2nd Baroness Keith (1788–1867)
Emily Jane Petty-FitzMaurice, Marchioness of Lansdowne, 8th Lady Nairne (1819–1895)
Henry Charles Keith Petty-FitzMaurice, 5th Marquess of Lansdowne, 9th Lord Nairne (1845–1927)
Henry William Edmund Petty-FitzMaurice, 6th Marquess of Lansdowne, 10th Lord Nairne (1872–1936)
Charles Petty-Fitzmaurice, 7th Marquess of Lansdowne, 11th Lord Nairne (1917–1944)
Katherine Evelyn Constance Bigham, Viscountess Mersey, 12th Lady Nairne (1912–1995)
Richard Maurice Clive Bigham, 4th Viscount Mersey, 13th Lord Nairne (1934–2006)
Edward John Hallam Bigham, 5th Viscount Mersey, 14th Lord Nairne (born 1966)

The heir presumptive is the present holder's daughter Hon. Flora Diana Joan Bigham, Mistress of Nairne (born 2003).

See also
Marquess of Atholl
Viscount Keith
Marquess of Lansdowne
Viscount Mersey

Notes

References
Attribution:

Further reading
Kidd, Charles, Williamson, David (editors). Debrett's Peerage and Baronetage (1990 edition). New York: St Martin's Press, 1990, 

Nairne

1681 establishments in England
Noble titles created in 1681